Quotient space may refer to a quotient set when the sets under consideration are considered as spaces. In particular:

Quotient space (topology), in case of topological spaces
Quotient space (linear algebra), in case of vector spaces
Quotient space of an algebraic stack
Quotient metric space

See also 

Quotient object